Live and Let Live is a live album released by the British neo-progressive band Twelfth Night in 1984.

Details
The album was recorded on 4–5 November 1983 at Geoff Mann's last dates as a member of the band. Earlier in the year, Geoff had announced his wish to leave the band and this album marked his departure.

Both shows were also filmed to a single camera and may see release eventually.

Before there was a deal with Music for Nations to release this album, it was going to be on the band's own label, Twelfth Night Records, catalog number TN-007. Because of that catalog number, the band wanted to have the title of the album to refer to a James Bond title, and Live and Let Live was chosen.

Songs Performed
The complete set list for both nights was "The Ceiling Speaks", "Human Being", "The End of the Endless Majority", "We Are Sane", "Deep in the Heartland", "Fact and Fiction", "The Poet Sniffs a Flower", "The Collector", "Afghan Red" and "Sequences". Encores: "Creepshow", "Art and Illusion", "East of Eden", "Aspidentropy" and "Love Song".

Track listing
All songs written by Twelfth Night
 "The Ceiling Speaks" (8:26) recorded 4 November 1983
 "The End of the Endless Majority" (3:18)  recorded 5 November 1983 (soundcheck)
 "We Are Sane" (12:04)  recorded 4 November 1983 (intro) and 5 November 1983 
 "Fact and Fiction" (5:27)  recorded 5 November 1983 
 "The Poet Sniffs a Flower" (4:03)  recorded 5 November 1983 
 "Sequences" (17:14)  recorded 5 November 1983

First Reissue
The album was re-released for the first time on CD in 1993 by the now defunct Dutch label SI Music. Three bonus tracks were added for the CD: "The Creepshow", "East of Eden" and "Love Song". "East of Eden" was played as a medley with "Art and Illusion", but the latter track was edited from the running list for the reissue.

Tracks as above, with three bonus tracks:
  "Creepshow" (12:06)  recorded 5 November 1983 
 "East of Eden" (5:14)  recorded 5 November 1983 
 "Love Song" (8:29) recorded 5 November 1983

Second Reissue
The album was re-released for the second time in 2012 recreating the entire show from diverse sources.

Disc 1
 "The Ceiling Speaks" (8:17) recorded 4 November 1983, first released on the original Live and Let Live vinyl album in 1984
 "Human Being" (7:54) recorded 4 November 1983, previously unreleased
 "The End of the Endless Majority" (3:18) recorded at the soundcheck on 5 November 1983, previously unreleased remix, first released on the original Live and Let Live vinyl album in 1984
 "We Are Sane" (12:01) recorded 4 November 1983, first released on the original Live and Let Live vinyl album in 1984
 "Deep in the Heartland" (4:28) recorded at the soundcheck on 5 November 1983, previously unreleased
 "Fact and Fiction" (5:26) recorded 5 November 1983, first released on the original Live and Let Live vinyl album in 1984
 "The Poet Sniffs a Flower" (4:09) recorded 5 November 1983, first released on the original Live and Let Live vinyl album in 1984
 "The Collector" (19:42) recorded 27 October 1983, previously unreleased

Disc 2
 "Afghan Red" (11:00) recorded 4 November 1983, previously unreleased
 "Sequences" (17:16) recorded 5 November 1983, first released on the original Live and Let Live vinyl album in 1984
 "Creepshow" (12:27) recorded 5 November 1983, first released on the CD reissue of Live and Let Live in 1993
 "Art and Illusion" (4:03) recorded 5 November 1983, first released on Geoff Mann’s Recorded Delivery CD in 2003
 "East of Eden" (5:21) recorded 5 November 1983, first released on the CD reissue of Live and Let Live in 1993
 "Aspidentropy" (9:51) recorded 5 November 1983, first released on Geoff Mann’s Recorded Delivery CD in 2003
 "Love Song" (8:37) recorded 5 November 1983, first released on the CD reissue of Live and Let Live in 1993

Personnel
Brian Devoil drums, percussion 
Geoff Mann vocals, percussion
Clive Mitten bass, keyboards, classical guitar 
Andy Revell electric and acoustic guitar 
Rick Battersby keyboards

References

Twelfth Night (band) albums
1984 live albums
Music for Nations live albums
Live albums recorded at The Marquee Club